Taygete is a genus of moths in the family Autostichidae.

Species
 Taygete altivola (Meyrick, 1929)
 Taygete attributella (Walker, 1864)
 Taygete balsamopa (Meyrick, 1923)
 Taygete barydelta (Meyrick, 1923)
 Taygete citranthes (Meyrick, 1923)
 Taygete citrinella (Barnes & Busck, 1920)
 Taygete consociata (Meyrick, 1914)
 Taygete critica (Walsingham, 1910)
 Taygete decemmaculella (Chambers, 1875)
 Taygete gallaegenitella (Clemens, 1864)
 Taygete ignavella (Zeller, 1877)
 Taygete lasciva (Walsingham, 1910)
 Taygete notospila (Meyrick, 1923)
 Taygete parvella (Fabricius, 1794)
 Taygete platysoma (Walsingham, 1910)
 Taygete saundersella (Chambers, 1876)
 Taygete sphecophila (Meyrick, 1936)
 Taygete sylvicolella (Busck, 1903)

References

 
Symmocinae